The Mosul question was a territorial dispute in the early 20th century between Turkey and the United Kingdom (later Iraq) over the possession of the former Ottoman Mosul Vilayet.

The Mosul Vilayet was part of the Ottoman Empire until the end of World War I, when it was occupied by Britain. After the Turkish War of Independence, the new Turkish Republic considered Mosul one of the crucial issues determined in the National Pact. Despite constant resistance, Britain managed to bring the issue into the international arena and to scale it down to a frontier problem between Turkey and Iraq. During the negotiations for the Treaty of Lausanne the Turkish side argued that the Kurds and Turks are not “racially separable“ and the Arabs constitute only an inferior part of the population. Turkey appealed for the populations right of Self Determination and claimed its majority wants to be a part of Turkey. The British responded that the Kurds are of Indo European and the Turks of Ural Altaic origin and on the 4 February 1923 the parties decided the Mosul Question to be excluded from the negotiations of the Lausanne Treaty.

On May 19, 1924, the Istanbul Conference was held between Turkey and England. At the conference, the Turkish side argued that Mosul has historically always remained Ottoman territory and that this situation did not change at the end of the First World War, and that in this situation where two-thirds of the population of the province consists of Muslim Turks and Kurds, Mosul should be within the borders of Turkey according to historical, military and ethnic reasons. The Istanbul Conference was dissolved after the British side absolutely rejected the Turkish State's request. The dispute was taken to the League of Nations. Here, the Turkish side repeated their thesis at the Istanbul Conference and demanded a referendum (general referendum). Britain also rejected the plebiscite request, stating that the people of the region were unconscious. A commission was set up in the League of Nations to investigate the issue and it could not be resolved.

The League of Nations Council appointed an investigative commission that recommended that Iraq should retain Mosul, and Turkey reluctantly assented to the decision by signing the Frontier Treaty of 1926 with the Iraqi government. Iraq agreed to give a 10 percent royalty on Mosul's oil deposits to Turkey for 25 years.

History

Shortly before the end of World War I, on October 30, 1918, the debilitated Ottoman Empire and the United Kingdom signed the Armistice of Mudros. The agreement stipulated a cessation of hostilities effective October 31, 1918. For the British, "It was most desirable that Mosul should be occupied by the British  force and General Marshall should send a detachment to Mosul to accept the surrender of the Turkish garrison". After discussions with Ali Ihsan Pasha, the local Ottoman commander, and communications between London and the Ottoman government in which the British justified their intent by reference to Clause 7 of the agreement and their intent to proceed in any event, the local commander was instructed to withdraw, and the British occupied Mosul on 10 November 1918.

In August 1920, the Treaty of Sèvres was signed to end the war, but the Ottomans still contested the British right to Mosul as being taken illegally since Mudros. Even when the Treaty of Lausanne was signed between Turkey and Britain in 1923, Turkey maintained that Britain was controlling the Mosul Vilayet illegally. British officials in London and Baghdad continued to believe that Mosul was imperative to the survival of Iraq because of its resources and the security of its mountainous border.  Turkish leaders were also afraid that Kurdish nationalism would thrive under the British mandate and start trouble with the Kurdish population in Turkey.

To reach a resolution on the conflicting claims over Mosul, the League of Nations was called on to send a factfinding commission to determine the rightful owner.  The commission investigated the region and reported that Turkey had no claim to Mosul, which belonged to the British, and that no one else had any rightful claim to the area. Britain was highly influential in the League of Nations. The Secretary of the War Cabinet, Maurice Hankey, had already decided before the commission's work was completed that Britain needed to have control over the whole area because of its oil concerns for the Royal Navy.

Because the British also wanted to soothe Turkish anger over the League of Nations decision, they gave Turkey a portion of the oil profits. By having control over the oil and the Iraq Petroleum Company, the British stayed in control of the resources of Mosul even though they had given political control back to Faysal.

Another area of contention between Britain and Turkey was the actual boundary line. There was a Brussels Line, which had been decided by the League of Nations as the true border of Iraq, and a British line, which had been the division line that the Britain had used as reference. When that was brought up to British leaders, both Percy Cox, the British High Commissioner of Iraq, and Arnold Wilson, the British civil commissioner in Baghdad, urged Prime Minister Lloyd George to use the Brussels Line because they did not think there was that large of a difference between the two lines.

Other claimants

Kingdom of Iraq
The Mosul Vilayet was not just contested by external powers, Britain and Turkey. Faysal ibn Husayn, the Hashemite ruler who had become the king of the newly-created state of Iraq by the British in 1921, also wanted to claim the Mosul Vilayet as his. In part Faisal wanted the Mosul Vilayet because due to its Sunni majority, it would bring a counterweight to the Shia majority of the Iraqi population. The British liked and respected Faysal because of all of the assistance that he had given to them, and they also felt that they could trust him to do what they wanted. In that belief, Britain was both right and wrong. Faysal was a brilliant diplomat who balanced what the British wanted and the true needs of his people into a very complex system. However, one of the things that he wanted most was the unification of and a strong status for Iraq, which he did not believe to be possible without the control of the Mosul Vilayet.

Prior to the League of Nations decision, Faysal had continually petitioned the British government to give control of Mosul to him so that he could succeed in his aim of unification. Finally, after the League of Nations decision, the British agreed to let Faysal control Mosul in return for important resource concessions. The British founded the Turkish Petroleum Company, which they later renamed to the Iraq Petroleum Company (IPC).

Kurds
Another internal group that wanted control over Mosul was the Kurds. They were over half the population and had long fought integration into Iraq because they wanted independence. Most Kurds did not consider themselves as a part of the new country of Iraq. Various Kurdish leaders rallied Kurdish groups that already had their own weapons and had been helped by different imperial powers on occasions that it suited their needs. Furthermore, many Kurds felt betrayed by promises that the British had made in earlier times but not kept. Faysal wanted to integrate them because most were Sunnis, and he felt that he needed them to balance out the Shi'ite population. Britain used both the Kurdish firepower and Faysal's desire for a united Iraq to keep a stranglehold over him, and Iran under Khomeini later used the Kurds and their firepower to keep the unrest in Iraq. The Kurds did not want to be integrated into Iraq but supported the continuance of the British mandate in the area.

Demographics
The vilayet had an Arabic-speaking population, a Turkish-speaking population, a Kurdish-speaking population and a large Assyrian-Syriac-speaking population. In contrast to Mosul's neighbours, it was much more directly integrated into the Ottoman Empire. In terms of religious communities, it was predominately Sunni, with notable communities of Christian Assyrians, Yazidis and Jews that made up a total population of about 800,000 people in the early 20th century. The communities and their respective leaders were heavily influenced by the political hierarchy, trading networks, and the judicial system of the Ottoman Empire even though they considered themselves on their own and not completely controlled by the empire.

Economic resources

During the period of Ottoman rule, Mosul was involved in the production of fine cotton goods. Oil was a known commodity in the region and has been critically important ever since World War I. Mosul was considered a trading capital of the Ottoman Empire because of its location along the trade routes to India and the Mediterranean; it was also considered a political sub-capital.

Local politics
The leadership was constantly plagued with accusations of corruption and incompetence, and leaders were replaced with an alarming regularity. Also, because of those problems, the administration of Mosul was entrusted to Palace and notable favorites, and the high officials' careers were usually determined by tribal issues within their states.

See also
1918 Clemenceau–Lloyd George Agreement (Middle East)
Treaty of Ankara (1926)

References

External links
 

Territorial disputes of Turkey
History of Mosul
Iraq–Turkey relations
National questions
Turkey–United Kingdom relations